David Briggs may refer to:

Music people
 David Briggs (American musician) (born 1943), American keyboardist and record producer
 David Briggs (Australian musician) (born 1951), Australian guitarist with Little River Band and record producer
 David Briggs (English musician) (born 1962), English organist and composer
 David Briggs (record producer) (1944–1995), American record producer

Others
 Dave Briggs (journalist) (born 1976), American television news anchor
 David Briggs, inventor of Who Wants to Be a Millionaire?
 David Briggs (headmaster) (1917–2020), English headmaster of King's College School, Cambridge
 David Briggs (Lord Lieutenant), High Sheriff of Cheshire (2006) and Lord Lieutenant of Cheshire (since 2010)
 David T. Briggs (born 1954), president of Erie Plating Company

Fictional characters
 David Briggs, a character in the 1993 television series The Detectives